The King's Cup is Australia's blue riband annual rowing race for men. Since 1878 it has been  contested by state representative senior heavyweight men's coxed eights at the annual Australian Interstate Regatta. Since 1973 the Australian Interstate Regatta has been conducted on the final day of the week-long annual Australian Rowing Championships. The King's Cup is the final event of the Australian Championships and the Interstate Regatta.

Early history
Victoria and New South Wales commenced inter-colonial racing in eight-oared boats in 1878 when the Victorian Rowing Association invited New South Wales oarsmen from the Sydney and the Mercantile clubs to boat crews for a race on the lower Yarra River over about four miles. Queensland, South Australia and Tasmania all showed an interest in entering crews from the mid-1880s but disagreements over definitions of amateur status resulted in inconsistencies in eligibility criteria in the early decades. New South Wales held firm to a view that not just professional sportsmen and those employed around boats would be deemed non-amateurs but also all manual labourers. The other states had relaxed this view by 1899. Queensland and Tasmania first entered crews in 1885 and then Queensland raced regularly from 1890. From 1899 South Australia were racing annually. Following Federation the race became the interstate eight-oared championship with Tasmania and West Australia boating crews regularly by 1906.

The Trophy

Since 1921 the crews have competed for the King's Cup. The trophy had been won by a First Australian Imperial Force crew at the Royal Peace Regatta held in London in 1919 following the cessation of hostilities at the end of World War I and was presented to the victorious eight-oared boat by King George V. In time, and in spite of dogged resistance from the Australian War Memorial, the Victorian Rowing Association petitioned the King to express his intention for the Cup, and at his command it became the perennial trophy to be presented to the winning state representative men's eight at the annual Australian Rowing Championships. 

The AIF #1 crew, all former club oarsmen who secured the King's Cup for Australia were seated as follows: Bow - Sgt. Archie A Robb (Derwent Rowing Club, Tasmania); 2 - Lieut. Fred A House (Derwent Rowing Club, Tasmania); 3 - Lieut. Thomas McGill (Leichhardt Rowing Club, NSW); 4 - Gnnr. Arthur Scott (Murray Bridge Rowing Club, SA); 5 - Lieut. Henry Hauenstein (Leichhardt Rowing Club, NSW); 6 - Maj. Sydney Middleton (Sydney Rowing Club, NSW); 7 - Gnnr. George William Mettam (West Aust Rowing Club), WA; Str - Capt. Harold Clive Disher (Melb Uni Boat Club, Vic ); Cox - Sgt. Albert Smedley (Sydney Rowing Club, NSW).

High-achievers
 James Tomkins rowed in Victorian King's Cup VIIIs on eighteen occasions between 1985 & 2008 for fifteen victories and three 2nd places.
 Mike McKay rowed sixteen times for Victoria in the King's Cup for thirteen wins and two seconds.
 Karsten Forsterling contested the King's Cup in Victorian VIIIs on twelve occasions in the fifteen year period from 2001 to 2015. He was in the winning crew on six occasions and placed 2nd six times.
 James Chapman contested the King's Cup in NSW VIIIs on twelve occasions in the thirteen years from 2003 to 2015. He was in victorious on seven occasions. He rowed in crews with Samuel Loch, Matt Ryan and Fergus Pragnell to six consecutive victories between 2008 and 2013.
 David Anderson of the Leichhardt Club rowed in eight consecutive New South Wales King's Cup VIIIs from 1950 to 1957 for two victories.
 Phil Cayzer stroked the New South Wales King's Cup VIII on five occasions from 1948 to 1954, winning the championship in 1949, 1950 and 1951.
 Alan Grover coxed the New South Wales King's Cup VIII five times consecutively from 1962 to 1969 and then in 1980 for a sixth time.
 Michael Morgan rowed in New South Wales King's Cup VIIIs for six consecutive years from 1968 to 1973, winning the title in 1968 and 1972.

Winners

References

Rowing competitions in Australia